The Lower Glenelg National Park is a national park in the Western District of Victoria, Australia. The major features of the park are the Glenelg River gorge and the Princess Margaret Rose Cave. Much of the route of the Great South West Walk is located within the national park.

The park abuts the Cobboboonee National Park in the east and the Lower Glenelg River Conservation Park across the border with  South Australia in the west. To the south lies the Discovery Bay Coastal Park which is adjacent to the Southern Ocean.

Land within the national park, the Discovery Bay Coastal Park and the Nelson Streamside Reserve was listed as a Ramsar site known as the Glenelg Estuary and Discovery Bay Ramsar Site on 28 February 2018.

See also

 Protected areas of Victoria

References

National parks of Victoria (Australia)
Protected areas established in 1969
1969 establishments in Australia
Parks of Barwon South West (region)